Taad (also Romanized as Ţād and Tād; also known as Yād) is a village in  Pir Bakran District, Falavarjan County, Isfahan Province, Iran. At the 2006 census, its population was 3,671, in 993 families.

References 

Populated places in Falavarjan County